Robertus is a genus of comb-footed spiders that was first described by Octavius Pickard-Cambridge in 1879. It is considered a senior synonym of Garritus.<ref name=Kast1946>{{cite journal| last=Kaston| first=B. J.| year=1946| title=North American spiders of the genus Ctenium| journal=American Museum Novitates| issue=1306| page=1}}</ref>

Species
 it contains forty-seven species, found in Europe, Asia, North America, the Congo, and on Greenland:Robertus alpinus Dresco, 1959 – ItalyRobertus arcticus (Chamberlin & Ivie, 1947) – USA (Alaska)Robertus arundineti (O. Pickard-Cambridge, 1871) – Europe, Turkey, Caucasus, Russia (Europe to South Siberia), Kazahstan, Central Asia, ChinaRobertus banksi (Kaston, 1946) – USA, CanadaRobertus borealis (Kaston, 1946) – USA, CanadaRobertus brachati Wunderlich, 2011 – TurkeyRobertus calidus Knoflach, 1995 – CongoRobertus cantabricus Fage, 1931 – SpainRobertus cardesensis Dresco, 1959 – SpainRobertus crosbyi (Kaston, 1946) – USA, CanadaRobertus emeishanensis Zhu, 1998 – ChinaRobertus eremophilus Chamberlin, 1928 – USARobertus floridensis (Kaston, 1946) – USARobertus frivaldszkyi (Chyzer, 1894) – Central and south-eastern EuropeRobertus frontatus (Banks, 1892) – USA, CanadaRobertus fuscus (Emerton, 1894) – USA, Canada, GreenlandRobertus golovatchi Eskov, 1987 – GeorgiaRobertus heydemanni Wiehle, 1965 – Sweden, Germany, Austria, Italy, Romania, Ukraine, Russia (Europe to West Siberia), KazakhstanRobertus insignis O. Pickard-Cambridge, 1908 – EuropeRobertus kastoni Eskov, 1987 – Russia (Middle Siberia to Russian Far East), JapanRobertus kuehnae Bauchhenss & Uhlenhaut, 1993 – Belgium, Switzerland, Germany, AustriaRobertus laticeps (Keyserling, 1884) – USARobertus lividus (Blackwall, 1836) – USA (Alaska), Europe, Caucasus, Russia (Europe to Far East), IranRobertus longipalpus (Kaston, 1946) – USA, CanadaRobertus lyrifer Holm, 1939 – Iceland, Scandinavia, Austria, Russia (Europe to Far East), CanadaRobertus mazaurici (Simon, 1901) – FranceRobertus mediterraneus Eskov, 1987 – Mediterranean, Switzerland, Austria, Eastern Europe, CaucasusRobertus monticola Simon, 1914 – FranceRobertus naejangensis Seo, 2005 – KoreaRobertus neglectus (O. Pickard-Cambridge, 1871) (type) – Europe, Russia (Europe to South Siberia), KazakhstanRobertus nipponicus Yoshida, 1995 – JapanRobertus nojimai Yoshida, 2002 – JapanRobertus ogatai Yoshida, 1995 – JapanRobertus peregrinus Yang, Irfan & Peng, 2019 – ChinaRobertus potanini Schenkel, 1963 – ChinaRobertus pumilus (Emerton, 1909) – USARobertus riparius (Keyserling, 1886) – USA, CanadaRobertus saitoi Yoshida, 1995 – JapanRobertus scoticus Jackson, 1914 – Europe, Caucasus, Russia (Europe to Middle Siberia)Robertus sibiricus Eskov, 1987 – Russia (Middle Siberia to Far East), JapanRobertus similis (Kaston, 1946) – USARobertus spinifer (Emerton, 1909) – USARobertus subtilis Seo, 2015 – KoreaRobertus truncorum (L. Koch, 1872) – France to UkraineRobertus ungulatus Vogelsanger, 1944 – Europe, Russia (South Siberia to Far East), ChinaRobertus ussuricus Eskov, 1987 – Russia (Far East)Robertus vigerens (Chamberlin & Ivie, 1933) – USA, Canada

In synonymy:R. asper (O. Pickard-Cambridge, 1871) = Robertus neglectus (O. Pickard-Cambridge, 1871)R. exortus (Drensky, 1929, T from Agroeca) = Robertus frivaldszkyi (Chyzer, 1894)R. fuscus (Emerton, 1911) = Robertus fuscus (Emerton, 1894)R. grasshoffi Wunderlich, 1973 = Robertus neglectus (O. Pickard-Cambridge, 1871)R. palustris (Banks, 1892) = Robertus laticeps (Keyserling, 1884)R. paradoxus Miller, 1967 = Robertus ungulatus Vogelsanger, 1944R. terrestris (Emerton, 1913) = Robertus frontatus (Banks, 1892)R. umbilicatus Denis, 1961 = Robertus mazaurici'' (Simon, 1901)

See also
 List of Theridiidae species

References

Araneomorphae genera
Spiders of Asia
Spiders of North America
Taxa named by Octavius Pickard-Cambridge
Theridiidae